Timo Wehrle (born 25 June 1996) is a German footballer who plays as a forward for Bahlinger SC.

Career
Wehrle made his professional debut for SpVgg Unterhaching in the 3. Liga on 5 August 2014, coming on as a substitute in the 88th minute for Pascal Köpke in the 2–0 away win against Jahn Regensburg.

References

External links
 Profile at DFB.de
 Profile at kicker.de
 Profile at Fussball.de
 FC Denzlingen statistics at Fussball.de
 Bahlinger SC II statistics at Fussball.de

1996 births
Living people
Sportspeople from Freiburg im Breisgau
Footballers from Baden-Württemberg
German footballers
Association football forwards
SpVgg Unterhaching II players
SpVgg Unterhaching players
3. Liga players
Bahlinger SC players